Fredericka of Saxe-Gotha-Altenburg (17 July 1715 – 2 May 1775), was a German noblewoman member of the House of Wettin and by marriage Duchess of Saxe-Weissenfels.

Born in Gotha, she was the fifteenth of nineteen children born from the marriage of Frederick II, Duke of Saxe-Gotha-Altenburg and Magdalena Augusta of Anhalt-Zerbst. From her eighteen older and younger siblings, only eight survived to adulthood: Frederick III, Duke of Saxe-Gotha-Altenburg, William, John August, Christian William, Louis Ernest, Maurice, Augusta (by marriage Princess of Wales), and John Adolph.

Life
In Altenburg on 27 November 1734, Fredericka married Prince Johann Adolf of Saxe-Weissenfels as his second wife. Two years later (1736), Johann Adolf inherited the paternal domains after the death of his older brother.

The union produced five children, all of them died in infancy:
 Karl Frederick Adolf, Hereditary Prince of Saxe-Weissenfels (Weissenfels, 7 June 1736 – Weissenfels, 24 March 1737).
 Johann Adolf, Hereditary Prince of Saxe-Weissenfels (Weissenfels, 27 June 1738 – Weissenfels, 21 October 1738).
 August Adolf, Hereditary Prince of Saxe-Weissenfels (Weissenfels, 6 June 1739 – Weissenfels, 7 June 1740).
 Johann Georg Adolf, Hereditary Prince of Saxe-Weissenfels (Weissenfels, 17 May 1740 – Weissenfels, 10 July 1740).
 Fredericka Adolfine (Weissenfels, 27 December 1741 – Langensalza, 4 July 1751).

After her husband's death in 1746 at the age of 31, Fredericka retired to Dryburg Castle in Langensalza, the usual Wittum of the Dowager Duchesses of the Weissenfels branch. Shortly after, she acquired a bourgeois garden and more lands in the east of the old town, in front of the city walls.  Between 1749-1751 was built under her orders a Rococo style palace called the Fredericka's Castle (German: Friederikenschlösschen).  The building had mansard roofs with ornate dormers.  Two cavalry houses flanked the castle.  The park has an orangery, and a coach house, which still existed today.  The entrance portal carries an alliance coat of arms of Saxe-Gotha-Altenburg and Saxe-Weissenfels.  The Dowager Duchess died there aged 59.  She was buried in the Schlosskirche, Weissenfels.

After Fredericka's death her former personal physician, Christian Friedrich Stöller, acquired the property.  From 1922 to the 1990s, the castle was in the possession of Ida Mary Fries-Fiscowitsch.  Thanks to the private owners until 1945 the interior was changed, but the exterior remained almost intact.  In the 1990s, the castle became the property of the city, and during 1994-2000 the castle and park were renovated.  Based on historical plans of the castle, the garden was reconstructed in the Baroque basic structure from 1751.  Since 1946, the castle and park was used for cultural events, and weddings.

Notes

References
Brigitte Buhlmann, Ingelore Thara: Kleines Lexikon der Persönlichkeiten der Stadt Bad Langensalza und von Ufhoven, Publisher Rockstuhl.
Christoph Gottlob Heinrich: Sächsische Geschichte, Leipzig, 1782, p. 457. Online (retrieved 11 October 2014).
Kerstin Sucher, Bernd Wurlitzer: Thüringen, DuMont Publishing, 2006, p. 81. Online (retrieved 11 October 2014).
Friederikenschlösschen in: Badlangensalza.de [retrieved 11 October 2014].
Women in Power: 1740-1770 [retrieved 11 October 2014].

|-
 

 

Fredericka
1715 births
1775 deaths
People from Gotha (town)
⚭Fredericka of Saxe-Gotha-Altenburg
Daughters of monarchs